Mawella Lagoon Airport is an airport in Dickwella, Sri Lanka .

Airlines and destinations

References

Airports in Sri Lanka
Buildings and structures in Matara District